Screen Queensland Studios are a set of film studios located in Brisbane, Queensland, Australia. They are the second of two major studio lots in Queensland, the other being Village Roadshow Studios on the Gold Coast.

Description 
Screen Queensland Studios studios are owned by Screen Queensland and are designed for low-mid budget domestic and international feature films, television drama series, subscription/streaming video on-demand shows, and television commercials.

Productions 
Films produced at the studios include:
 Love and Monsters (2020)
 Blackwater Abyss (2020)

Clients 
Clients include:
 Paramount Pictures

See also 

 List of films shot in Brisbane
 Queensland Film Corporation

References

External links 

Film studios
Australian film studios
Film production companies of Australia